Molodiia  is a village in Chernivtsi Raion, Chernivtsi Oblast (province) of western Ukraine. It is composed of a single village, Molodiia. This was first officially attested in a document dated 1486. It belongs to Chahor rural hromada, one of the hromadas of Ukraine.

History 
Until 18 July 2020, Molodiia belonged to Hlyboka Raion. The raion was abolished in July 2020 as part of the administrative reform of Ukraine, which reduced the number of raions of Chernivtsi Oblast to three. The area of Hlyboka Raion was merged into Chernivtsi Raion.

Population 
1930 — 3960
1989 — 3741
2007 — 3847

References

External links

Official web-site of Molodiya's secondary school

Villages in Chernivtsi Raion
Shtetls